TabletSat-Aurora is a Russian micro-satellite launched in 2014. The satellite is built in shape of hexagonal prism, with 6 foldable solar panels. It is claimed to be the first privately developed satellite in Russian Federation.

Launch
TabletSat-Aurora was launched from Dombarovsky site 13, Russia, on 19 June 2014 by a Dnepr rocket. Two-way communication with Earth was successfully established soon after launch.

Mission
It intended to verify technologies for the future satellite constellation earth observation technologies Main payload is the panchromatic photo camera capable of 15m resolution at nadir.

See also

 2014 in spaceflight

References

External links
 Gunters space page on TabletSat-Aurora

Earth observation satellites of Russia
Spacecraft launched by Dnepr rockets
Spacecraft launched in 2014